Alexander Osipenko (Осипенко, Александр Викторович ; born December 29, 1984) is a Russian ice hockey player. He is currently playing with HC Spartak Moscow of the Kontinental Hockey League (KHL).

Osipenko made his Kontinental Hockey League (KHL) debut playing with HC Vityaz Podolsk during the 2009–10 KHL season.

References

External links

1984 births
Living people
HC Spartak Moscow players
Russian ice hockey forwards
Ice hockey people from Moscow